Section 32 is a California-based venture fund founded by Google Ventures founder, Bill Maris. Section 32 funds technology, biotechnology, healthcare and life sciences companies and has approximately $1 billion under management.

History
Section 32 was founded by the by Google Ventures founder, Bill Maris. Bill Maris' background is in technology and neuroscience, and he retired from Google Ventures (later GV) after he declared "mission accomplished." He founded Section 32 to invest in technology, healthcare and the life science companies.

The fund aimed to raise $100 million however, citing a strong interest, the first fund raise was $160 million, and the firm now has approximately $1 billion under management.

In December 2017, Michael Pellini, the former CEO and standing Chairman of Foundation Medicine joined Section 32 as a Managing Partner along with another ex-Google Ventures senior leader, Jenn Kercher, who joined as Chief Operating Officer and General Counsel. Google Ventures former CFO, Jonathan Faerber, and Bill Maris' long term Executive Assistant and Chief of Staff from Google Ventures, Lindsey Archarya, both joined Section 32 in 2018.

In early 2019, Section 32 announced that it had raised nearly $200M for a second fund.

In November 2019, Steve Kafka, joined Section 32 as a Managing Partner. He served as both founding CEO and Executive Chairman of Thrive Earlier Detection, and President and Chief Operating Officer at Foundation Medicine.

In 2020, Section 32 announced it was raising $350M for its third fund. Sarah Larson, formerly at Third Rock Ventures, and Alice Cheung, formerly at Google and X, joined in March 2020 as Chief People Officer and Head of Talent.

In March 2021, Andy Harrison joined Section 32 as a Managing Partner. He previously held executive leadership roles at Alphabet, including Verily Life Sciences (previously Google Life Sciences) and X (previously GoogleX). Sue Hager, formerly an executive at Foundation Medicine and EQRx, joined as Chief Investor Relations and Communications Officer, also in March 2021. Section 32 has notably invested in Kobalt Music Group, Thrive, Vir, Relay, Coinbase, Crowdstrike, Metromile, and Singular Genomics.

References

External links
Official website

Venture capital firms of the United States